Nicholas Bayly may refer to:

Nicholas Bayly (Newry MP) (17th century), MP for Newry in the Irish House of Commons
Sir Nicholas Bayly, 2nd Baronet (1709–1782), British MP, grandson of the above
Nicholas Bayly (Anglesey MP) (1749–1814), MP for Anglesey, son of the above